Bigopur is a village in the Mahendergarh district of Haryana, India. It is near to Rajasthan border.

Demographics of 2011
As of 2011 India census, Bigopur had a population of 2228 in 420 households. Males (1180) constitute 52.96%  of the population and females (1048) 47.03%. Bigopur has an average literacy (1531) rate of 68.71%, less than the national average of 74%: male literacy (927) is 60.54%, and female literacy (604) is 39.45% of total literates(1531). In Bigopur, 10.95% of the population is under 6 years of age (244).

Crusher Zone
Stone crusher zone is specified by the Haryana Government and environment clearance is needed for the same.

Railway Station
Nizampur is the nearest railway station near to Bigopur and it is 6 km from Bigopur.

References 

Cities and towns in Mahendragarh district